Shun'ei is a Japanese name.  It may refer to:

People

 Katsukawa Shun'ei (1762–1819), a Japanese ukiyo-e artist
 Nishida Shun'ei (b. 1953), a Japanese painter
 Shun-ei Izumikawa, a Japanese astronomer

Other

 NEC Shun-Ei, a Nihon Ki-in Go competition.